Highland Village is a city in Denton County, Texas, United States. It is a suburb of Dallas and Fort Worth, located on the south side of the far western branch of Lewisville Lake. As of the 2020 United States census the city's population was 15,899.

History
Highland Village incorporated as a city February 1963. It included 516 residents in the 1970 census, but the opening of the Dallas/Fort Worth International Airport helped spur massive growth in the city's population: 3,246 in 1980, 7,027 in 1990, 12,173 in 2000, and 15,056 in 2010. The city remains a primarily residential area, though more business development is occurring.

Geography

The climate in this area is characterized by hot, humid summers and generally mild to cool winters.  According to the Köppen climate classification, Highland Village has a humid subtropical climate, Cfa on climate maps.

Demographics

As of the 2020 United States census, there were 15,899 people, 5,475 households, and 4,423 families residing in the city.

Education
Highland Village is served by the Lewisville Independent School District, which has three elementary schools and one middle school located in the city. Edward S. Marcus High School, located in Flower Mound but near Highland Village, is the city's principal high school.

Transportation

Highland Village voted to become a member of the Denton County Transportation Authority (DCTA) in September 2003. It is currently served with Commuter Express coach service to Denton and downtown Dallas. DCTA initiated bus service in Highland Village in January 2008. In 2011, Highland Village/Lewisville Lake station opened as a commuter rail station on DCTA's A-train.

In March 2020, DCTA replaced the Highland Village Connect Shuttle with a Lyft discount program to increase overall network efficiency. DCTA's on-demand GoZone service, which launched September 2021 in partnership with Via Transportation, ultimately replaced the Lyft program to provide transportation in Highland Village.

Notable people

 Mason Cox, Professional Australian Rules footballer for Collingwood Magpies of the Australian Football League
 Hayley Orrantia, American actress, singer, songwriter. Portrays Erica Goldberg on ABC's The Goldbergs
 Paxton Pomykal, Professional Soccer Player for FC Dallas

Notes

References

External links
 City of Highland Village official website
 The Cross Timbers Gazette, local newspaper
 Lewisville Independent School District

Dallas–Fort Worth metroplex
Cities in Denton County, Texas
Cities in Texas
Populated places established in the 1960s